Neopisinus is a genus of comb-footed spiders that was first described by M. A. L. Marques, E. H. Buckup & E. N. L. Rodrigues in 2011.

Species
 it contains nine species, found in South America, the Caribbean, the United States, Mexico, and Panama:
Neopisinus bigibbosus (O. Pickard-Cambridge, 1896) – Mexico, Panama
Neopisinus bruneoviridis (Mello-Leitão, 1948) – Panama, Trinidad to Brazil
Neopisinus cognatus (O. Pickard-Cambridge, 1893) – USA to Peru, Brazil
Neopisinus fiapo Marques, Buckup & Rodrigues, 2011 (type) – Brazil
Neopisinus gratiosus (Bryant, 1940) – Cuba, Hispaniola
Neopisinus longipes (Keyserling, 1884) – Peru, Brazil
Neopisinus putus (O. Pickard-Cambridge, 1894) – Mexico to Panama
Neopisinus recifensis (Levi, 1964) – Brazil
Neopisinus urucu Marques, Buckup & Rodrigues, 2011 – Brazil

See also
 List of Theridiidae species

References

Araneomorphae genera
Spiders of North America
Spiders of South America
Theridiidae